Supernatural is an American, fantasy, horror television series created by Eric Kripke. It was first broadcast on September 13, 2005, on The WB, and subsequently became part of successor The CW's lineup. Starring Jared Padalecki as Sam Winchester and Jensen Ackles as Dean Winchester, the series follows the two brothers as they hunt demons, ghosts, monsters, and other supernatural beings in the world.

Constellation Awards 
The Constellation Awards is a set of Canadian awards given annually for the best science fiction or fantasy works and achievements of the previous year. Supernatural has received eighteen awards from their thirty-nine nominations.

|-
|rowspan="7" align="center"|2007||rowspan="2"|Supernatural||Best Science Fiction Television Series of 2006||
|-
||Outstanding Canadian Contribution to Science Fiction Film or Television in 2006||
|-
||Jensen Ackles||Best Male Performance in a 2006 Science Fiction Television Episode (for "In My Time of Dying")||
|-
||Jared Padalecki||Best Male Performance in a 2006 Science Fiction Television Episode (for "Croatoan")||
|-
||Serge Ladoucer||Best Technical Accomplishment in a 2006 Science Fiction Film or TV Production – Cinematography||
|-
||EntityFX||Best Technical Accomplishment in a 2006 Science Fiction Film or TV Production – Visual Effects||
|-
||Eric Kripke||Best Overall 2006 Science Fiction Film or Television Script (for "In My Time of Dying")||
|-
|rowspan="5" align="center" |2008||rowspan="2"|Supernatural||Best Science Fiction Television Series of 2007||
|-
||Outstanding Canadian Contribution to Science Fiction Film or Television in 2007||
|-
||Jensen Ackles||Best Male Performance in a 2007 Science Fiction Television Episode (for "What Is and what Should Never Be")||
|-
||Jared Padalecki||Best Male Performance in a 2007 Science Fiction Television Episode (for "Born Under a Bad Sign")||
|-
||Raelle Tucker || Best Overall 2007 Science Fiction Film or Television Script (for "What Is and What Should Never Be")||
|-
|rowspan="5" align="center"|2009||rowspan="2"|Supernatural||Best Science Fiction Television Series Of 2008||
|-
||Outstanding Canadian Contribution to Science Fiction Film/TV||
|-
||Jensen Ackles||Best Male Performance in a 2008 Science Fiction Television Episode (for "In the Beginning")||
|-
||Jeremy Carver||Best Overall 2008 Science Fiction Film or Television Script (for "In the Beginning")||
|-
||Serge Ladoucer||Best Technical Accomplishment in a Film or TV Production – Cinematography (for "Monster Movie")||
|-
|rowspan="4" align="center"|2010||Supernatural||Best Science Fiction Television Series of 2009||
|-
|Jensen Ackles||Best Male Performance in a 2009 Science Fiction Television Episode (for "The End")||
|-
|Misha Collins||Best Male Performance in a 2009 Science Fiction Television Episode (for "The Rapture")||
|-
|Alona Tal||Best Female Performance in a 2009 Science Fiction Television Episode (for "Abandon All Hope")||
|-
|align="center"|2011||Supernatural||Best Science Fiction Television Series of 2010||
|-
|rowspan="6" align="center"|2012||rowspan="2"|Supernatural||Best Science Fiction Television Series of 2011||
|-
||Outstanding Canadian Contribution to Science Fiction Film or Television in 2011||
|-
||Misha Collins||Best Male Performance in a 2011 Science Fiction Television Episode (for "The French Mistake")||
|-
||Jim Beaver||Best Male Performance in a 2011 Science Fiction Television Episode (for "Death's Door")||
|-
||Ben Edlund||Best Overall 2011 Science Fiction Film or Television Script (for "The French Mistake")||
|-
||Ivan Hayden||Best Technical Accomplishment in a 2011 Science Fiction Film or Television Production – Visual Effects (for "Meet the New Boss")||
|-
|rowspan="7" align="center"|2013||rowspan="4"|Supernatural||Best Science Fiction Television Series of 2012||
|-
||Outstanding Canadian Contribution to Science Fiction Film or Television in 2012|| 
|-
||Best Technical Accomplishment in a 2012 Science Fiction Film or TV Production – Visual Effects||
|- 
||Best Overall Science Fiction Film or Television Script||
|-
||Jared Padalecki||Best Male Performance in a 2012 Science Fiction Television Episode (for "The Born-Again Identity")||
|-
||Jensen Ackles||Best Male Performance in a 2012 Science Fiction Television Episode (for "We Need To Talk About Kevin")||
|-
||Felicia Day||Best Female Performance in a 2012 Science Fiction Television Episode (for "The Girl With The Dungeons And Dragons Tattoo")||
|-
|rowspan="4" align="center"|2014||Supernatural||Best Science Fiction Television Series of 2013||
|-
||Jeremy Carver||Best Overall 2013 Science Fiction Film or Television Script (for "Sacrifice")||
|-
||Mark Meloche||Best Technical Accomplishment in a 2013 Science Fiction Film or Television Production||
|-
||Felicia Day||Best Female Performance in a 2013 Science Fiction Television Episode (for "Pac-Man Fever")||
|-

Critics' Choice Super Awards 
The Critics' Choice Super Awards is an awards show presented annually by the Critics Choice Association to honor the finest in genre fiction film, television and home media releases, including action, superhero, horror, science fiction, fantasy and animation releases. They were first established in 2020, with the inaugural ceremony taking place on January 10, 2021, virtually, due to the COVID-19 pandemic. Supernatural has won one award from three nominations.

|-
|align="center" rowspan="3"|2020||Supernatural||Best Horror Series||
|-
||Jensen Ackles||Best Actor in a Horror Series||
|-
||Jared Padalecki||Best Actor in a Horror Series||
|-

EWwy Awards 
The EWwy Awards is a television production award created by Entertainment Weekly to honor worthy actors and series not nominated for the Primetime Emmys. Jensen Ackles has received all two awards from his nominations for his work as Dean Winchester.

|-
|align="center"|2008||Jensen Ackles||Best Actor in a Drama Series||
|-
|align="center"|2010||Jensen Ackles||Best Actor in a Drama Series||
|-

Fangoria Chainsaw Awards 
The Fangoria Chainsaw Awards is an award ceremony that goes out to horror films and thriller films. Supernatural has received one nomination.

|-
|align="center"|2006||Supernatural||Killer Television||
|-

GLAAD Media Awards 
The GLAAD Media Awards is an accolade bestowed by the Gay & Lesbian Alliance Against Defamation (GLAAD) to recognize and honor various branches of the media for their outstanding representations of the lesbian, gay, bisexual and transgender (LGBT) community and the issues that affect their lives. Supernatural has received three nominations.

|-
|align="center"|2009||Supernatural||Outstanding Individual Episode (in a series without a regular LGBT character) (for "Ghostfacers")||
|-
|align="center"|2010||Supernatural||Outstanding Individual Episode (in a series without a regular LGBT character) (for "The Real Ghostbusters")||
|-
|align="center"|2014||Supernatural||Outstanding Individual Episode (in a series without a regular LGBT character) (for "LARP and the Real Girl")||
|-

Golden Reel Awards 
The Golden Reel Awards is presented annually by the Motion Picture Sound Editors (MPSE) to sound editors. Supernatural has received four nominations.

|-
|align="center"|2006||Michael E. Lawshe (Supervising Sound Editor), Timothy A. Cleveland (Sound Editor/Sound Designer), Adam Johnston (Sound Editor/Sound Designer), Marc Meyer (Sound Editor/Sound Designer), Paul J. Diller (Sound Editor), David Lynch (Sound Editor), Brian Risner (Sound Editor), Stuart Calderon (Sound Editor/Foley Editor), Casey J. Crabtree (Foley Artist), Michael Crabtree (Foley Artist)||Best Sound Editing in Television: Short Form – Sound Effects and Foley (for "Pilot")||
|-
|align="center"|2007||Michael E. Lawshe (Supervising Sound Editor), Marc Meyer (Sound Designer), Jackie Crabtree (Supervising Foley Editor), Casey J. Crabtree (Foley Artist), Michael Crabtree (Foley Artist), Monette Beck (Foley Artist), Jason Oliver (Sound Effects Editor)||Best Sound Editing in Television: Short Form – Sound Effects and Foley (for "Salvation")||
|-
|align="center"|2008||Michael E. Lawshe (Supervising Sound Editor), Marc Meyer (Sound Designer), Paul J. Diller (Sound Editor), Norval D. Crutcher, III (Supervising Sound Editor), Stuart Calderon (Sound Editor), Timothy A. Cleveland (Sound Editor), Davide Lynch (Sound Editor), Casey J. Crabtree (Foley Artist), Michael Crabtree (Foley Artist)||Best Sound Editing in Television: Short Form – Sound Effects and Foley (for "All Hell Breaks Loose, Part 2")||
|-
|align="center"|2011||Monette Melvin (Foley Artist), Rick Owens (Foley Artist), Michael E. Lawshe (Supervising Sound Editor), Marc Meyer (Sound Designer), Trevor Sperry (Supervising Foley Editor), Paul J. Diller (Sound Editor), Norval D. Crutcher, III (Supervising Sound Editor), Timothy A. Cleveland (Sound Editor)||Best Sound Editing in Television: Short Form – Sound Effects and Foley (for "Point of No Return")||
|-

Leo Awards 
The Leo Awards is the awards program for the British Columbia film and television industry. Supernatural has received four awards from their thirteen nominations.

|-
|align="center"|2008||Jessica Harmon||Best Guest Performance by a Female in a Dramatic Series (for "All Hell Breaks Loose, Part 1")||
|-
|align="center"|2009||Mandy Playdon||Best Guest Performance by a Female in a Dramatic Series (for "Family Remains")||
|-
|align="center" rowspan="2"|2011||Ivan Hayden, Grant Lindsay||Best Visual Effects in a Dramatic Series (for "Hammer of the Gods")||
|-
||Matt Frewer||Best Guest Performance by a Male in a Dramatic Series (for "Two Minutes to Midnight")||
|-
|align="center"|2012||Ivan Hayden, Grant Lindsay||Best Visual Effects in a Dramatic Series (for "Meet the New Boss")||
|-
|align="center"|2013||Patricia Hargreaves||Best Costume Design in a Dramatic Series (for "Of Grave Importance")||
|-
|align="center"|2014||Mark Meloche, Grant Lindsay, Christopher Richardson, Trevor Chong, Kevin Genzel||Best Visual Effects in a Dramatic Series (for "Sacrifice")||
|-
|align="center"|2015||Brianna Buckmaster||Best Guest Performance by a Female in a Dramatic Series (for "Hibbing 911") ||
|-
|align="center" rowspan="3"|2016||Mark Meloche, Grant Lindsay, Adam Williams, Christopher Richardson, Mladen Miholijcic||Best Visual Effects in a Dramatic Series (for "O Brother Where Art Thou?")||
|-
||Mark Meloche, Grant Lindsay, Christopher Richardson, Mladen Miholijcic, Cory Virs||Best Visual Effects in a Dramatic Series (for "Brother's Keeper")||
|-
||Charmaine Clark||Best Hairstyling in a Dramatic Series (for "The Werther Project")||
|-
|align="center" rowspan="2"|2018||Rob Hayter||Best Stunt Coordination in a Dramatic Series (for "Lost and Found")||
|-
||Seth Isaac Johnson||Best Guest Performance by a Male in a Dramatic Series (for "Advanced Thanatology")||
|-

People's Choice Awards 
The People's Choice Awards is an American awards show, recognizing the people and the work of popular culture, voted on by the general public. Supernatural has received nine awards from their twenty-three nominations.

|-
|align="center"|2009||Supernatural||Favorite Sci-Fi/Fantasy Show||
|-
|align="center"|2010||Supernatural||Favorite Sci-Fi/Fantasy Show||
|-
|align="center"|2011||Supernatural||Favorite Sci-Fi/Fantasy Show||
|-
|align="center" rowspan="2"|2012||Supernatural||Favorite Network TV Drama||
|-
||Supernatural||Favorite Sci-Fi/Fantasy Show||
|-
|align="center" rowspan="4"|2013||rowspan="2"|Supernatural||Favorite Sci-Fi/Fantasy Show||
|-
||Favorite TV Fan Following||
|-
||Jared Padalecki||Favorite Dramatic TV Actor||
|-
||Jensen Ackles||Favorite Dramatic TV Actor||
|-
|align="center" rowspan="4"|2014||Supernatural||Favorite Sci-Fi/Fantasy Show||
|-
||Jared Padalecki, Jensen Ackles, Misha Collins||Favorite TV Bromance||
|-
||Jared Padalecki||Favorite Sci-Fi/Fantasy TV Actor||
|-
||Jensen Ackles||Favorite Sci-Fi/Fantasy TV Actor||
|-
|align="center" rowspan="5"|2015||Supernatural||Favorite Network Sci-Fi/Fantasy TV Show||
|-
||Jared Padalecki||Favorite Sci-Fi/Fantasy TV Actor||
|-
||Jensen Ackles||Favorite Sci-Fi/Fantasy TV Actor||
|-
||Misha Collins||Favorite Sci-Fi/Fantasy TV Actor||
|-
||Jared Padalecki and Jensen Ackles||Favorite TV Duo||
|-
|align="center" rowspan="3"|2016||Supernatural||Favorite Network Sci-Fi/Fantasy||
|-
||Jensen Ackles||Favorite Sci-Fi/Fantasy TV Actor||
|-
||Misha Collins||Favorite Sci-Fi/Fantasy Actor||
|-
|align="center"|2017||Supernatural||Favorite Network Sci-Fi/Fantasy Show||
|-
|align="center"|2018||Supernatural||Sci-Fi/Fantasy Show of 2018||
|-
|align="center"|2020||Supernatural||Sci-Fi/Fantasy Show of 2020||
|}

Primetime Emmy Awards 
The Primetime Emmy Awards is an American accolade bestowed by the Academy of Television Arts & Sciences in recognition of excellence in American primetime television programming. Supernatural has received three nominations.

|-
|align="center" rowspan="2"| 2006 || Christopher Lennertz || Outstanding Music Composition for a Series (Original Dramatic Score) || 
|-
||Michael Lawshe (Supervising Sound Editor), Timothy Cleveland (Sound Effects Editor), Paul J. Diller (Sound Effects Editor), Marc Meyer (Sound Effects Editor), David Lynch (Sound Effects Editor), Jessica Dickson (Dialogue Editor), Karyn Foster (Dialog/ADR Editor), Chris McGeary (Music Editor), David Lee Fein (Foley Artist), Jody Thomas (Foley Artist) || Outstanding Sound Editing for a Series|| 
|-
|align="center"|2008||Michael Lawshe (Supervising Sound Editor), Norval "Charlie" Crutcher, III (Supervising ADR Editor), Karyn Foster (Dialogue Editor), Marc Meyer (Supervising Sound Effects Editor), Timothy Cleveland (Sound Effects Editor), Paul Diller (Sound Effects Editor), Albert Gomez (Sound Effects Editor), Casey Crabtree (Foley Artist), Michael Crabtree (Foley Artist), Dino Moriana (Music Editor)||Outstanding Sound Editing (for "Jus in Bello")||
|-

Rondo Hatton Classic Horror Awards 
The Rondo Hatton Classic Horror Awards is an award presented annually by the Classic Horror Film Board to honor outstanding works in horror in film, television, home video, and publishing, voted on by the general public. Supernatural has received five nominations.

|-
|align="center"|2009||Supernatural||Best Television Presentation (for "In the Beginning")||
|-
|align="center"|2010||Supernatural||Best Television Presentation (for "The End")||
|-
|align="center"|2011||Supernatural||Best Television Presentation (for "Live Free or Twihard")||
|-
|align="center"|2011||Supernatural||Best Television Presentation (for "My Heart Will Go On")||
|-
|align="center"|2013||Supernatural||Best Television Presentation (for "Party On, Garth")||
|-

Saturn Awards 
The Saturn Awards is an award presented annually by the Academy of Science Fiction, Fantasy & Horror Films to honor the top works mainly in science fiction, fantasy, horror in film, television, and home video. Supernatural has received eight nominations.

|-
|align="center"|2006||Supernatural|||Best Network Television Series||
|-
|align="center"|2008||Supernatural||Best Network Television Series||
|-
|align="center"|2009||Supernatural||Best Network Television Series||
|-
|align="center"|2011||Supernatural||Best Network Television Series||
|-
|align="center"|2012||Supernatural||Best Network Television Series||
|-
|align="center"|2013||Supernatural||Best Network Television Series||
|-
|align="center"|2014||Supernatural||Best Youth-Oriented Television Series||
|-
|align="center"|2015||Supernatural||Best Youth-Oriented Television Series||
|-
|align="center"|2019||Supernatural||Best Horror Television Series||

SFX Awards 
The SFX Awards celebrates the previous year's achievements in science fiction and are voted on by the readers of the SFX magazine. Supernatural has received four awards from their sixteen nominations.

|-
|align="center"|2007||Jensen Ackles||Best TV Actor||
|-
|align="center" rowspan="2"|2008||Supernatural||Best TV Show||
|-
||Jared Padalecki||Best TV Actor||
|-
|align="center" rowspan="2"|2010||Supernatural||Best TV Show||
|-
||Robert Singer (Director), Julie Siege (Writer)||Best TV Episode (for "Criss Angel is a Douchebag")||
|-
|align="center" rowspan="2"|2011||Supernatural||Best TV Show||
|-
||Eric Kripke (Writer), Steve Boyum (Director), Eric 'Giz' Gewirtz (Story By)||Best TV Episode (for "Swan Song")||
|-
|align="center" rowspan="9"|2013||rowspan="2"|Supernatural||Best TV Show||
|-
||Best TV Episode (for "Hunteri Heroici")||
|-
||Jared Padalecki||Best TV Actor||
|-
||Jensen Ackles||Best TV Actor||
|-
||Misha Collins||Best TV Actor||
|-
||Jensen Ackles||Sexiest Man||
|-
||Jared Padalecki||Sexiest Man||
|-
||Misha Collins||Sexiest Man||
|-
||Mark A. Sheppard||Best Villain||
|-

Teen Choice Awards 
The Teen Choice Awards is an annual awards show that airs on the Fox television network. Supernatural has received two awards from their twenty-two nominations. After much delay, in 2015, Jared Padalecki won "Choice TV Actor: Fantasy/Sci-Fi", and Jensen Ackles and Misha Collins won "Choice TV: Chemistry".

|-
|align = "center" rowspan="2"|2006||Supernatural||Teen Choice Award for Choice Breakout Series|Choice Breakout Show||
|-
|Jensen Ackles||Choice TV: Breakout Star||
|-
|align="center"|2007||Jared Padalecki||Teen Choice Award for Choice TV Actor Drama|Choice TV: Drama Actor||
|-
|align="center"|2010||Supernatural||Teen Choice Award for Choice Fantasy/Sci-Fi Series|Choice TV: Fantasy/Sci-Fi Show||
|-
|align="center" rowspan="2"|2011||Supernatural||Choice TV: Fantasy/Sci-Fi Show||
|-
||Jared Padalecki||Teen Choice Award for Choice TV Actor Fantasy/Sci-Fi|Choice TV: Sci-Fi/Fantasy Actor||
|-
|align="center" rowspan="3"|2012||Supernatural||Choice TV: Sci-Fi/Fantasy Show||
|-
||Jensen Ackles||Choice TV: Sci-Fi/Fantasy Actor||
|-
||Jared Padalecki||Choice TV: Sci-Fi/Fantasy Actor||
|-
|align="center" rowspan="3"|2013||Supernatural||Choice TV: Sci-Fi/Fantasy Show||
|-
||Jensen Ackles||Choice TV: Sci-Fi/Fantasy Actor||
|-
||Jared Padalecki||Choice TV: Sci-Fi/Fantasy Actor||
|-
|align="center" rowspan="2"|2015||Jared Padalecki||Choice TV: Sci-Fi/Fantasy Actor||
|-
|Jensen Ackles and Misha Collins||Choice TV: Chemistry||
|-
|align="center" rowspan="4"|2016||Supernatural||Choice TV: Sci-Fi/Fantasy Show||
|-
||Jared Padalecki||Choice TV: Sci-Fi/Fantasy Actor||
|-
||Misha Collins||Choice TV: Scene Stealer||
|-
||Jensen Ackles and Misha Collins||Choice TV: Chemistry||
|-
|align="center" rowspan="3"|2017||Supernatural||Choice TV: Sci-Fi/Fantasy Show||
|-
||Jensen Ackles||Choice TV: Sci-Fi/Fantasy Actor||
|-
||Mark Pellegrino||Choice TV: Villain||
|-
|align="center"|2018||Supernatural||Choice TV: Sci-Fi/Fantasy Show||
|-
| rowspan=2 align="center"|2019 ||Supernatural||Choice TV: Sci-Fi/Fantasy Show||
|-
| Jared Padalecki||Choice Sci-Fi/Fantasy TV Actor||
|}

TV Guide Awards 
The TV Guide Awards was an annual award created by the editors of TV Guide magazine, as a readers poll to honor outstanding programs and performers in the American television industry. Supernatural has received all four awards from their nominations. Furthermore, at the end of 2010, Supernatural won the cover of TV Guide Magazine, with fans casting over five million votes.

|-
|align="center" rowspan="3"|2011||Supernatural||Favorite Sci-Fi Series||
|-
||Jensen Ackles||Favorite Actor||
|-
||Misha Collins||Favorite Non-Human||
|-
|align="center"|2012||Supernatural||Favorite Horror Series||
|-

Young Artist Awards 
The Young Artist Awards is an accolade bestowed by the Young Artist Association to honor excellence of youth performers. Supernatural has received two awards from their eight nominations.

|-
|align="center"|2007||Colby Paul||Best Performance in a TV Series (Comedy or Drama) – Guest Starring Young Actor||
|-
|rowspan="2" align="center"|2008||Nicholas Elia||Best Performance in a TV Series — Guest Starring Young Actor (for "The Kids Are Alright")||
|-
|Conchita Campbell||Best Performance in a TV Series — Guest Starring Young Actress (for "Playthings")||
|-
|align="center"|2009||Nicole Leduc||Best Performance in a TV Series – Guest Starring Young Actress (for "Wishful Thinking")||
|-
|align="center" rowspan="3"|2010||Colin Ford||Best Performance in a TV Series – Recurring Young Actor 13 and Under||
|-
||Cainan Wiebe||Best Performance in a TV Series – Guest Starring Young Actor 13 and Under (for "After School Special")||
|-
||Dalila Bela||Best Performance in a TV Series – Guest Starring Young Actress (for "I Believe the Children Are Our Future")||
|-
|align="center"|2011||Adom Osei||Best Performance in a TV Series – Guest Starring Young Actor 11–13 (for "The Third Man")||
|-

Hugo Awards 
The Hugo Award is an award given by the World Science Fiction Society for the best science fiction or fantasy works in the previous year. Supernatural received its first Hugo nomination on April 26, 2016. The awards were presented on August 21, 2016.

|-
|align="center"|2016||Supernatural||Best Dramatic Presentation, Short Form (for "Just My Imagination")||
|-

References 

Supernatural
Supernatural (American TV series)